The Distillers are an American punk rock band, formed in Los Angeles, California in 1998 by vocalist and guitarist Brody Dalle. Dalle co-wrote, played guitar and provided lead vocals for nearly every track on the band's three albums. After the breakup of the band in 2006, Dalle and Distillers guitarist Tony Bevilacqua went on to form Spinnerette.

History
The Distillers first came together in late 1998, when Australian-born guitarist Brody Dalle met bassist Kim Chi and the two bonded over their love for playing punk rock. They proceeded to recruit Detroit guitarist Rose Mazzola and drummer Matt Young.

Signed to Epitaph, the band issued its self-titled debut in April 2000. By the end of the year, Kim Chi had left the group to join Exene Cervenka in her band, the Original Sinners. For awhile The Nerve Agents bassist Dante Sigona was playing bass for The Distillers but  Ryan Sinn stepped in and took position. Matt departed to join Chi while Mazzola left during the height of "Seneca Falls". By summer 2002, The Distillers were composed of Dalle, Sinn, and new drummer Andy Granelli; joint American dates with No Doubt and Garbage were planned for later that fall. Guitarist/vocalist Tony Bradley joined The Distillers in time for the recording of their third album and major-label debut, Coral Fang, which was released in 2003 by Sire. Following her very public divorce from Rancid's Tim Armstrong that same year, Brody Dalle resumed performing under her own name.

Granelli left the band in early 2005, moving on to play with Darker My Love, and by summer, Sinn had exited as well, later joining up with Angels & Airwaves. Despite rumors, The Distillers, now just Dalle and Bradley, denied that they were breaking up, instead simply going on hiatus. In early 2006, Dalle had her first child, daughter Camille, with new husband Josh Homme of Queens of the Stone Age. By the year's end, the two remaining members formally announced the band's disbandment and went on to form Spinnerette together.

In January 2018, Dalle shared a teaser video from The Distillers' Instagram and a newly-opened Twitter account to confirm the return of the band. Initially, it was believed the four Twitter accounts that The Distillers' Twitter was following, would make up the 2018 line-up of the band: Dalle, Bradley, Granelli and former Spinnerette member Alain Johannes. Since then, however, the account has removed Johannes; and subsequently added former bassist Sinn. Bradley has since deleted his Twitter account.

It was later announced that the band would perform their first official show in over 13 years at The Casbah in San Diego, California in late April 2018.

On September 11, 2018, the Distillers official Instagram account announced the release of a new single available on iTunes. In April 2019, the band confirmed that they had begun recording their fourth album and follow-up to Coral Fang.

On April 28, 2019, The Distillers announced they would be entering the studio with English music producer Nick Launay.

Members
Current
Brody Dalle – lead vocals, guitar (1998-2006, 2018–present)
Ryan Sinn – bass, backing vocals (2000-2005, 2018–present)
Andy Granelli – drums (2000-2005, 2018–present)
Tony "Bradley" Bevilacqua – guitar, backing vocals (2003-2006, 2018–present)

Former
Rose "Casper" Mazzola – guitar, backing vocals (1998-2002)
Kim Chi – bass, backing vocals (1998-2000)
Mat Young – drums (1998-2000)
Dante Sigona – bass, backing vocals (2000)

Timeline

Discography

Studio albums

Extended plays

Singles

Music videos
 "The Young Crazed Peeling" (2002)
 "City of Angels" (2002)
 "Drain the Blood" (2003)
 "The Hunger" (2003)
 "Beat Your Heart Out" (2004)
 "Man vs. Magnet" (2018)

In popular culture

 In a February 2003 episode of Gilmore Girls, Jess surprises Rory with last-minute tickets to a Distillers concert.
 A version of the song "Muppet N.A.M.B.L.A" on the Leftöver Crack EP, Rock the 40 Oz featured Dalle on guest vocals.
 In the Daredevil episode "Kinbaku", "Die on a Rope" is played on the stereo of a car that Matt Murdock and Elektra steal.

Video games
 "Beat Your Heart Out" is featured in Tony Hawk's Underground 2.
"Beat Your Heart Out" is featured in  ATV Offroad Fury 3.
 "Dismantle Me" is featured in MTX Mototrax.
 "Seneca Falls" is featured in Tony Hawk's Pro Skater 4.
 "Drain the Blood" is featured in Gran Turismo 4 and is a downloadable song for Rock Band.
 The song "Beat Your Heart Out" and a cover of the "Spider-Man theme song" are featured in the video game adaptation of Spider-Man 2.
 The songs "City of Angels" and "Hall of Mirrors" both featured in the 2004 game True Crime: Streets of LA.
 "City of Angels" is featured in Crash 'N' Burn, as well as in the third episode of Sleeper Cell entitled "Money".

References

External links
The Distillers official website.
The Distillers at Facebook.
The Distillers at Instagram.
The Distillers at Twitter.
The Distillers at Myspace.

Hellcat Records artists
Musical groups established in 1998
Musical groups disestablished in 2006
Musical groups reestablished in 2018
Musical quartets
Street punk groups
Sire Records artists
Epitaph Records artists
Rise Records artists
Rock music groups from California
Musical groups from Los Angeles
Hardcore punk groups from California
Female-fronted musical groups
1998 establishments in California